Dark Resurrection is a 2007 Italian Star Wars fan film written and directed by Angelo Licata and produced by Davide Bigazzi and Licata. It was followed by a second episode, titled Dark Resurrection vol. 0 in 2011, and a Dark Resurrection vol. 2 is in the make.

Plot 
The story begins a few centuries after Return of the Jedi. Jedi Master Organa has foreseen the destruction of the Jedi, and send young Hope and her master, Zui Mar-Lee, to attempt to reach Eron first, before the dark Lord Sorran.

In the prequel vol. 0, Lord Sorran, a dark Jedi, searches for Eron, a mythical source of great power and finds the spaceship Resurrection, belonging to the Second Guardian of Eron. His crew gets killed on the ship, but Lord Sorran escapes with the secret of immortality.

Cast 
 Marcella Braga as Hope
 Riccardo Leto	as Leto
 Giuseppe Licata as Lord Sorran
 Sergio Múñiz as Muniza
 Grazia Ogulin	as Nemer
 Fabrizio Rizzolo as Zorol
 Sara Ronco as His
 Elisa Werneck	as Organa
 Giorgia Wurth as Meres
 Maurizio Zuppa as Zui Mar Lee

Production 
Movie scenes were shot in Italian Riviera in Liguria and further enhanced by special effects.

Reception 
The film was acclaimed by critics. In a short time it had an unexpected success, with over 15,000 downloads per day, and was broadcast on television.

Episodes 

The first episode was released on 2007, June 7. Its production cost about €7,000.

A second episode, called Dark Resurrection Vol. 0, was released on September 8, 2011 and is currently available on YouTube.

A third episode will be called Dark Resurrection Vol. 2. On the heels of Dark Resurrection Vol. 0 and Vol. 1, Dark Resurrection Vol. 2 is being launched on Fansflock.com, a new USA fanfunding platform. They are seeking help to fanfund the new epic finale. Angelo Licata, Director, has lined up some unique rewards for the film's contributors, from the lightsaber props used in the movie to meeting the cast, even to producer credits.

References

External links 
 
 
 fansflock.com

2007 films
2007 independent films
2007 science fiction films
Fan films based on Star Wars
Films shot in Italy
Italian independent films
2000s Italian-language films
2000s American films
2000s Italian films